Election of the Speaker of the Chamber of Deputies of the Parliament of the Czech Republic was held on 24 June 2010. Miroslava Němcová clashed with Lubomír Zaorálek. Němcová defeated Zaorálek and was elected the new Speaker.

Background
Speaker election was held after legislative election that concluded with victory of centre-right parties. Civic Democratic Party decided to nominate Miroslava Němcová while Czech Social Democratic Party nominated Lubomír Zaorálek. TOP 09 and Public Affairs agreed to support Němcová for the position.

Voting
Voting took place on 24 June 2010. Němcová received 118 votes while Zaorálek 79. Němcová became the first female Speaker of the Chamber. Němcová stated that she wants to keep two goals of the governing coalition - to cut spending and to do politics as a public service.

References

Speaker of the Chamber of Deputies of the Parliament of the Czech Republic election
2010
Speaker of the Chamber of Deputies of the Parliament of the Czech Republic election